Kronprinsessegade 14 is a Neoclassical property overlooking Rosenborg Castle Garden in central Copenhagen, Denmark.

History
The property was initially referred to as Lot 19A when Kronprinsessegade was created in c. 1800. The present building on the site was constructed by master builder Johan Martin Quist in 1805–6.

The property was listed in the new cadastre of 1806 as No. 389 in St. Ann's West Quarter. It was still owned by Qvist at that time.

The property was for a while owned by Supreme Court justice  Rosenkilde. In the 1830s, he sold it to administrator of Guscreditkassen Holm. In 1838, Christian Wilhelm Haagen	rented the second floor apartment for an annual rent of 60o Danish rigsdaler. The first floor apartment was at the same time let out to admiral Ulrich A. Schønheyder (1775-1858),

Architecture
 
The building consists of four storeys over a high cellar and is five bays wide. The ground floor is dressed while the three upper floors stand in blank, red blrick. The outer windows on the first floor are topped by rounded pediments supported by corbels. There is a frieze between the three central windows of the first and second floors.

Today
3B is based in the building.

References

External links

 Source
 1845 census

Listed residential buildings in Copenhagen
Residential buildings completed in 1806
1806 establishments in Denmark
Johan Martin Quist buildings